The following is a list of Geelong Football Club leading goalkickers in each season of the Australian Football League (formerly the Victorian Football League).

AFL leading goalkickers

AFL Women's leading goalkickers

Reference:

References
General

 

Specific

Goalkickers